Oldřišov is a municipality and village in Opava District in the Moravian-Silesian Region of the Czech Republic. It has about 1,500 inhabitants. It is part of the historic Hlučín Region.

History
The first written mention of Oldřišov is from 1234.

References

External links

Villages in Opava District
Hlučín Region